Aaron Dollar is a professor of Mechanical Engineering & Materials Science and Computer Science at Yale University, where he serves as the lead investigator of the GRAB Lab. His research focuses on analysis, design, and control of compliant mechanisms. In 2010, he was recognized as an innovator by being included in the MIT Technology Review's TR35 list.

Education
Ph.D., Harvard University Engineering Science
M.S., Harvard University
B.S., University of Massachusetts at Amherst, Mechanical Engineering

References

External links 
 TR35 profile
 Aaron Dollar lab page at Yale

Living people
Yale University faculty
University of Massachusetts Amherst College of Engineering alumni
Harvard School of Engineering and Applied Sciences alumni
Year of birth missing (living people)